Cathyalia pallicostalis is a species of snout moth in the genus Cathyalia. It was described by Francis Walker in 1863 and is found in Australia.

References

Moths described in 1863
Phycitini